Please Look After Mom is a novel by South Korean author Kyung-sook Shin. It sold a million copies within 10 months of release in 2009 in South Korea, is critically acclaimed internationally and the English translation by Chi-young Kim won the 2011 Man Asian Literary Prize. The novel has been adapted as a stage play and musical.

As of April 2012, the book has sold two million copies and the publisher has printed a 10,000-copy special edition to commemorate the achievement. The book was also chosen by Oprah to be one of her "18 Books to Watch for in April 2011  and by Amazon as one of its "Best Books of the Month: April 2011".

Plot
When sixty-nine-year-old So-Nyo is separated from her husband among the crowds of the Seoul subway station, her family begins a desperate search to find her.  Yet as long-held secrets and private sorrows begin to reveal themselves, they are forced to wonder: how well did they actually know the woman they called Mom? The novel explores the loss, self-recrimination, and in some cases, self-discovery caused by the mother's disappearance. The novel also considers themes related to the self-sacrifice of mothers in general (and in Korea in particular), the relationship between memories of the past and realities of the present, and the chameleonic aspects of identity.

Style
The style of Please Look After Mom is a bit unusual, as Julie Hunt noted in booklist, "Composed almost entirely in second-person narration, the writing is sharp, biting, and intensely moving."

Characters
Park So-nyo - mother of four children
Hyong-chol - So-nyo's oldest son
Chi-hon - So-nyo's eldest daughter
Yu-bin - Chi-hon's boyfriend
Yun Chin Hyong-chol's daughter
Yun Kyun - So-nyo's brother in law
Hong Tae-hee: a director of an orphanage whom she donated to

Stage play cast
Jung Hye-sun - Park Son-yo
Sim Yang-hong - Mr Yun
Kil Yong-woo - Young-chul
Seo Yee-sook - Ji-yeon

Reception

The book was also chosen by Oprah to be one of her "18 Books to Watch for in April 2011  and by Amazon as one of its "Best Books of the Month: April 2011".

Additionally, Please Look After Mom won the Man Asian Literary Prize in 2011.

References

External links
Please Look After Mom at Goodreads

2009 novels
21st-century South Korean novels
Novels set in Korea